This article lists the results and fixtures for the Scotland women's national football team from 2010 to 2019.

Key

Key to matches
Att. = Match attendance
(H) = Home ground
(A) = Away ground
(N) = Neutral ground

Results
Scotland's score is shown first in each case.

See also
Scotland at the FIFA Women's World Cup
Scotland women's national football team 1972–99 results
Scotland women's national football team 2000–09 results
Scotland women's national football team 2020–29 results

References

External links
Women's A Squad Results
Scotland women's national team results summary at worldfootball

2010
2010 in Scottish women's football
2011 in Scottish women's football
2012 in Scottish women's football
2013 in Scottish women's football
2014 in Scottish women's football
2015 in Scottish women's football
2016 in Scottish women's football
2017 in Scottish women's football
2018 in Scottish women's football
2019 in Scottish women's football